Nuestra Belleza Baja California 2012, was held at the Sala de Espectáculos del Centro Cultural Tijuana of Tijuana, Baja California on July 26, 2012. At the conclusion of the final night of competition Jeraldine González from Tijuana was crowned the winner. González was crowned by outgoing Nuestra Belleza Baja California titleholder Gabriela Acuña. Eleven contestants competed for the title.

Results

Placements

Contestants

References

External links
Official Website

Nuestra Belleza México
Beauty pageants in Tijuana